Aliesha Newman (born 16 September 1995) is an Australian rules footballer playing for Sydney in the AFL Women's (AFLW) competition. She previously played for the Melbourne Football Club and for Collingwood.

Early life
Newman was born in Queensland and is of Ningy Ningy Indigenous Australian descent. Her family is from Redcliffe, Queensland and she spent some of her youth on the Sunshine Coast, Queensland but moved to Melbourne in Victoria where Newman was raised and schooled.

AFLW career

Melbourne
Newman was recruited by Melbourne as a free agent in October 2016. She made her debut in the fifteen point loss to Brisbane at Casey Fields in the opening round of the 2017 season. She missed the next three matches before returning for the round five match against Greater Western Sydney at Blacktown International Sportspark Oval. She played the remainder of the season to finish with four matches for the year. Melbourne signed Newman for the 2018 season during the trade period in May 2017.

Collingwood
In August 2020, Newman was traded by Melbourne to Collingwood in a three-club deal which involved Richmond too.

Sydney
In May 2022, Newman joined expansion club Sydney. Newman played 9 games for the swans in the clubs inaugural AFLW season.

Personal life
Newman is originally from Braybrook in Melbourne's western suburbs. She is the older sibling of Australian weightlifter Teagan Newman.

Statistics
Statistics are correct to the end of the 2022 season.

|- style="background-color: #eaeaea"
! scope="row" style="text-align:center" | 2017
|style="text-align:center;"|
| 16 || 4 || 2 || 2 || 15 || 7 || 22 || 6 || 4 || 0.5 || 0.5 || 3.8 || 1.8 || 5.5 || 1.5 || 1.0 || 0
|- 
! scope="row" style="text-align:center" | 2018
|style="text-align:center;"|
| 16 || 7 || 3 || 3 || 36 || 13 || 49 || 10 || 15 || 0.4 || 0.4 || 5.1 || 1.9 || 7.0 || 1.4 || 2.1 || 0
|- style="background-color: #eaeaea"
! scope="row" style="text-align:center" | 2019
|style="text-align:center;"|
| 16 || 7 || 6 || 5 || 43 || 32 || 75 || 16 || 12 || 0.9 || 0.7 || 6.1 || 4.6 || 10.7 || 2.3 || 1.7 || 0
|- 
! scope="row" style="text-align:center" | 2020
|style="text-align:center;"|
| 16 || 7 || 0 || 7 || 30 || 23 || 53 || 5 || 20 || 0.0 || 1.0 || 4.3 || 3.3 || 7.6 || 0.7 || 2.9 || 0
|- style="background-color: #eaeaea"
! scope="row" style="text-align:center" | 2021
|style="text-align:center;"|
| 16 || 7 || 3 || 4 || 26 || 12 || 38 || 7 || 5 || 0.4 || 0.6 || 3.7 || 1.7 || 5.4 || 1.0 || 0.7 || 3
|- 
! scope="row" style="text-align:center" | 2022
|style="text-align:center;"|
| 16 || 7 || 2 || 1 || 32 || 9 || 41 || 10 || 7 || 0.3 || 0.1 || 4.6 || 1.3 || 5.9 || 1.4 || 1.0 || 0
|- class="sortbottom"
! colspan=3| Career
! 48
! 17
! 22
! 182
! 96
! 278
! 54
! 63
! 0.4
! 0.6
! 4.7
! 2.5
! 7.1
! 1.4
! 1.6
! 3
|}

References

External links 

1995 births
Living people
Melbourne Football Club (AFLW) players
Collingwood Football Club (AFLW) players
Indigenous Australian players of Australian rules football
Australian rules footballers from Melbourne
Sydney Swans (AFLW) players
People from Sunshine, Victoria